Emanuele Catania (born 15 March 1981) is an Italian football player. He plays for Siracusa.

Club career
He made his Serie B debut for Cosenza in the 2002–03 season.

On 9 July 2019 he joined Catania on an 1-year contract.

On 6 January 2020, he signed with Sicula Leonzio.

On 23 July 2020 he returned to Siracusa.

References

External links
 

1981 births
Footballers from Sicily
Living people
Italian footballers
S.S.D. Acireale Calcio 1946 players
Cosenza Calcio 1914 players
A.S.D. Paternò 1908 players
Taranto F.C. 1927 players
S.S. Fidelis Andria 1928 players
Cosenza Calcio players
Potenza S.C. players
A.S.G. Nocerina players
U.S. Avellino 1912 players
A.S.D. Sorrento players
S.S. Akragas Città dei Templi players
Siracusa Calcio players
Catania S.S.D. players
A.S.D. Sicula Leonzio players
Serie B players
Serie C players
Serie D players
Association football midfielders